"This Romeo Ain't Got Julie Yet" is a song written by Jimmy Olander and Eric Silver, and recorded by American country music group Diamond Rio.  It was released in July 1993 as the third single from their album Close to the Edge.  It peaked at number 13 in the United States, and number 5 in Canada.

Music video 
The music video was directed by directing duo Deaton-Flanigen and was released in summer of 1993. The video shows concert performances, along with behind-the-scenes footage from the group's 1992 show at Astroworld in Houston, Texas.

Chart performance

Year-end charts

References 

1993 singles
1992 songs
Diamond Rio songs
Music videos directed by Deaton-Flanigen Productions
Arista Nashville singles